Parni Valjak ("steamroller") is a Croatian and former Yugoslav rock band. They were one of the top acts of the former Yugoslav rock scene, and one of the top rock bands in Croatia.

Biography
Parni Valjak was founded in 1975 in Zagreb. Unlike many rock bands that would come later, their style was becoming more mainstream, becoming closer to pop, especially compared with the bands like Prljavo kazalište or Film.

As years went by, their refusal to change their style proved to be an important factor in the band's longevity. Parni Valjak kept a loyal following in 1980s and in 1990s, refusing to allow elements of folk and turbo folk music to become part of their repertoire. Because of that the band enjoys great respect among many Croatian rock critics, being seen as the embodiment of "true" rock and urban culture and many of their songs are considered evergreen in the former Yugoslavia like "Sve još miriše na nju", "Jesen u meni", "Ugasi me" and "Zastave". Parni Valjak kept a relatively small but dedicated following for 30 years, and many people attend their concerts marked by energetic performances, despite the advanced age of the band members: Aki Rahimovski - vocals, Husein Hasanefendić-Hus - guitars, Marijan Brkić Brk - guitars, Berislav Blažević-Bero - keyboards, Zvonimir Bučević-Buč - bass guitar, Dražen Scholz-Šolc - drums, Tina Rupčić - vocal, Anita Mlinarić - sax.

In December 2005, Parni Valjak made a farewell tour of Croatia and Slovenia on their 30th anniversary. Their last public performance in 2005 was a concert on New Year's Eve in Ban Jelačić Square in Zagreb, though they stated that more concerts may be held in future. In November 2009, they began a reunion tour in Croatia.

In October 2010, Parni Valjak held two concerts at Belgrade Arena, Belgrade that were followed by great public turnout (more than 44,000 people in two days).

Aki Rahimovski, the band’s lead vocalist, died on 22 January 2022, at the age of 66.

Discography

Albums
 Dođite na show! – 1976 ("Come to the show!")
 Glavom kroz zid – 1977 ("Head through the wall")
 Gradske priče – 1979 ("City stories")
 City kids - Steam Roller – 1980 (the band's only album sung entirely in English)
 Vruće igre – 1980 ("Hot games")
 Vrijeme je na našoj strani – 1981 ("Time is on our side")
 Glavnom ulicom – 1983 ("Down the main street")
 Uhvati ritam – 1984 ("Catch the beat")
 Pokreni se! – 1985 ("Move yourself!")
 Anđeli se dosađuju? – 1987 ("The angels are bored?")
 Sjaj u očima – 1988 ("Shine in the eyes")
 Lovci snova – 1990 ("The dream catchers")
 Buđenje – 1993 ("Waking up")
 Samo snovi teku uzvodno – 1997 ("Only dreams flow upstream")
 Zastave – 2000 ("Flags")
 Pretežno sunčano? – 2004 ("Mostly sunny?")
 Stvarno nestvarno – 2011 ("Real unreal")
 Nema predaje – 2013 ("No surrender")
 Vrijeme – 2018 ("Time")

Live albums
 Koncert (LIVE) – 1982 ("Concert")
 E = mc2 (LIVE) – 1985
 Svih 15 godina - LIVE... – 1990 ("All 15 years")
 Bez struje - LIVE in ZeKaeM – 1995 ("Unplugged: Live from the ZeKaeM")
 Kao nekada - LIVE at S.C. – 2001 ("As once - Live from Student Center")

DVDs
 25 godina; 2001 ("25 years")
 Bez struje - LIVE in ZekaeM (DVD+CD) – 2005 ("Unplugged: Live from the ZeKaeM")

VHS
 Koncert; 1988 ("Concert")

Singles
 Parni valjak" / "Šizofrenik", Alta/PGP RTB, 1976.
 Tako prođe tko ne pazi kad ga Parni valjak zgazi/Dok si mlad, PGP RTB, 1976.
 Ljubavni jadi jednog Parnog valjka/Teško je biti sam, PGP RTB, 1976.
 Prevela me mala/O šumama, rijekama i pticama, PGP RTB, 1976.
 Oću da se ženim/Ljeto, Jugoton, 1977.
 Lutka za bal/Crni dani, Jugoton, 1977.
 Od motela do motela/Predstavi je kraj, CBS/Suzy, 1978.
 Stranica dnevnika/Ulične tuče, Jugoton, 1979.
 Ugasi me/Ugasi me(instrumental), Jugoton, 1985.
 Kekec je slobodan, red je na nas (single) – 1992
 Kaži ja!/Sai Baba blues/Kaži ja! (Nu Zagreb Pepsi), Croatia Records, 1997.
 Mir na jastuku, Croatia Records, 2000.
 Srcekrad, Croatia Records, 2000.
 Ugasi me (uživo), Croatia Records, 2001.
 Tko nam brani/Dok si pored mene (single) – 2002
 Nakon svih godina, Croatia Records, 2009.
 To sam stvarno ja, Croatia Records, 2009.
 Stvarno nestvarno, 2010.

Compilations
 Parni valjak (compilation) – 1985 ("Steam roller")
 Pusti nek' traje - VOL.1 – 1992 ("Let it last")
 Balade – 1998 ("Ballads")
 Koncentrat 1977.-1983. – 2005 ("Concentrate 1977.-1983.")
 Koncentrat 1984.-2005. – 2005 ("Concentrate 1984.-2005.")
 The Ultimate Collection – 2009
 Najljepše ljubavne pjesme – 2010 ("Most beautiful love songs")
 The best of'' – 2010

See also
Music of Croatia
SFR Yugoslav Pop Rock scene
Croatia Records
Suzy Records
Jugoton

References

External links

 Official web-pages
 
 Unofficial web-pages

Croatian rock music groups
Musical groups established in 1975
Musical groups disestablished in 2005
Croatian new wave musical groups
Yugoslav rock music groups
Musicians from Zagreb